Ricky Landon Lawson is a Grammy-nominated American songwriter and A&R. He is best known for co-writing Billboard Hot 100-charting songs "Heated" and "Summer Renaissance" from step-sister Beyoncé's 2022 album Renaissance, as well as managing projects for her company Parkwood Entertainment, such as Chloe x Halle's "Ungodly Hour" visual.

Songwriting credits
Credits are courtesy of Discogs and Tidal.

Project management/a&r credits

Awards and nominations

References 

African-American songwriters
1992 births
Living people